Erol Kemah (born 20 November 1961) is a Turkish former wrestler who competed in the 1984 Summer Olympics and in the 1988 Summer Olympics.

References

External links
 

1961 births
Living people
Olympic wrestlers of Turkey
Wrestlers at the 1984 Summer Olympics
Wrestlers at the 1988 Summer Olympics
Turkish male sport wrestlers
World Wrestling Championships medalists